The women's basketball tournament at the 2015 Southeast Asian Games was held in Kallang, Singapore at the OCBC Arena Hall 1 from 9 to 15 June.

The official detailed schedule for the tournament was announced on 30 April 2015.

Draw
The draw was held on 30 April 2015 at the OCBC Arena Hall 1 during the 2015 SEABA Championship for men's team. All participating teams were drawn into one group.

Team rosters
At the start of tournament, all six participating countries had up to 12 players on their rosters.

Competition format
Round robin; the team with the best record wins the gold medal.

Results
All times are Singapore Standard Time (UTC+8)

Final standing

See also
Men's tournament

References

Women's basketball at the Southeast Asian Games
women's
2015 in women's basketball
International women's basketball competitions hosted by Singapore
2014–15 in Philippine basketball
2014–15 in Malaysian basketball
2014–15 in Indonesian basketball
2014–15 in Thai basketball
2014–15 in Singaporean basketball
2014–15 in Vietnamese basketball
Bask